Hastings is an unincorporated community in Jefferson Township, Kosciusko County, in the U.S. state of Indiana.

History
A post office was established at Hastings in 1891, and remained in operation until it was discontinued in 1903. The name of the community likely honors a family of settlers.

Geography

References

Unincorporated communities in Kosciusko County, Indiana
Unincorporated communities in Indiana